Serine/threonine-protein kinase MRCK alpha is an enzyme that in humans is encoded by the CDC42BPA gene.

The protein encoded by this gene is a member of the Serine/Threonine protein kinase family. This kinase contains multiple functional domains. Its kinase domain is highly similar to that of the myotonic dystrophy protein kinase (DMPK). This kinase also contains a Rac interactive binding (CRIB) domain, and has been shown to bind CDC42. It may function as a CDC42 downstream effector mediating CDC42 induced peripheral actin formation, and promoting cytoskeletal reorganization. Multiple alternatively spliced transcript variants have been described, and the full-length nature of two of them has been reported.

References

External links

Further reading